Mark Twain's America is a 1998 IMAX film documenting the United States through the eyes and words of Mark Twain. The film heavily features Twain hometown of Hannibal, Missouri. The film also weaves in historical photos, the steamboats of the Mississippi, Civil War reenactments, and a frog jumping contest. It was directed by Stephen Low with a 52-minute runtime, with narration by Anne Bancroft.

References

1998 films
1998 documentary films
IMAX short films
1998 short films
IMAX documentary films